Michael F. Hochella, Jr. is an American geoscientist and currently a University Distinguished Professor (Emeritus) at Virginia Tech and a Laboratory Fellow at Pacific Northwest National Laboratory.  He is a Fellow of the American Association for the Advancement of Science, Royal Society of Chemistry, Geochemical Society, European Association of Geochemistry, Mineralogical Society of America, International Association of GeoChemistry, Geological Society of America and American Geophysical Union. His interests are nanogeoscience, minerals, biogeochemistry and geochemistry. Currently among greater than 21,000 citations, his highest cited first-author paper is Nanominerals, mineral nanoparticles, and earth systems at over 880 citations, and published in the journal Science in 2008, and his highest cited co-authored paper is Nanotechnology in the real world: Redeveloping the nanomaterial consumer products inventory at over 1,800 citations, and published in the Beilstein Journal of Nanotechnology in 2015, according to Google Scholar.  He is a former President of both the Geochemical Society and the Mineralogical Society of America.  He is also the Founder and former Director of NanoEarth (https://www.nanoearth.ictas.vt.edu/), a node of the National Nanotechnology Coordinated Infrastructure (NNCI), an NSF-funded network of 16 centers spread throughout the United States serving as user facilities for cutting edge nanotechnology research. NanoEarth is part of Virginia Tech's Institute for Critical Technology and Applied Science (ICTAS), and headquartered in Blacksburg, Virginia. Hochella has won many honors, medals, and awards for both research and teaching, including the Dana Medal of the Mineralogical Society of America, the Clair C. Patterson Medal of the Geochemical Society, the Geochemistry Division Medal of the American Chemical Society, and the Virginia Outstanding Faculty Award, the highest honor for faculty in the Commonwealth of Virginia.

Education
He earned his B.S. in 1975 and M.S. in 1977 at Virginia Tech and his Ph.D at Stanford University in 1981. He began teaching at Stanford before returning to Virginia Tech.

Publications

References

Fellows of the American Association for the Advancement of Science
Virginia Tech faculty
Virginia Tech alumni
Stanford University alumni
Living people
Year of birth missing (living people)
American geochemists
Presidents of the Geochemical Society